Mordellistena episternaloides is a species of beetle in the genus Mordellistena of the family Mordellidae. It was described in 1963 by Ermisch and can be found in France and Germany.

References

episternaloides
Beetles described in 1963
Beetles of Europe